North–South Ski Bowl was a modest ski area in the western United States, located in northern Idaho in the Hoodoo Mountains of southern Benewah County.

Its bowl-shaped slope in the Idaho Panhandle National Forest faced northeast and the vertical drop was just under  on Dennis Mountain, accessed from State Highway 6, south of Emida and north of Harvard. An "upside-down" ski area, the parking lot and lodge were at the top, less than a mile east of the highway, formerly designated as 95A (U.S. 95 Alternate).

History
With a day lodge built in the late 1930s by the Civilian Conservation Corps (CCC) through the Works Progress Administration (WPA),
In the early 1950s, it was known as the "St. Joe Ski Bowl," and prior to that as the "Emida Ski Bowl." After a poor snow year in 1958, it was sold to a private owner, Fred Craner and his brother, Merle, and a platter lift was added in 1959.

It was the primary training area for the WSU and UI intercollegiate ski teams, and included a ski jump. The Ramskull Ski club formed in 1960, named for the creek of the ski area. The road from the highway was improved and parking areas expanded in 1962.

Closed for the 1969–70 season, the students of WSU (ASWSU) regained ownership and operated North–South until 1980. Additions included a chairlift in 1970, and a new lodge in 1976, and the area was lit for night skiing. The area got into financial difficulty in 1979, and the students searched for a buyer. After leasing it to a private operator in 1980 for four seasons, ASWSU sold the area outright in 1984.

Present day
With an aging chairlift and inconsistent snowfall at a low elevation, alpine skiing was discontinued in the 1990s. The entrance area near the highway is now a "Park 'n' Ski" area for cross-country skiing and the top of the former ski area is home to Palouse Divide Lodge, a private conference and retreat facility.

See also
Tamarack Ski Area – near Troy (defunct)

References

External links
Palouse Divide Lodge – official site
Virtual tour
WSU.edu – daytrips – Inside Idaho 
U.S. Forest Service – Palouse Divide Park 'n' Ski area
Map 

Idaho Department of Transportation – camera – State Highway 6 – Harvard Hill
 David Rumsey Map Collection – Historic road map (1937) – Idaho, Montana, Wyoming – Texaco (Rand McNally)
Idaho highway map (1956) – Shell (H.M. Gousha)

Ski areas and resorts in Idaho
Buildings and structures in Benewah County, Idaho
Washington State University